Hadj Belkheir (born 12 May 1977 in Relizane) is a boxer from Algeria, who participated in the 2004 Summer Olympics for his native North African country. He did not continue past the first round of the Featherweight (57 kg) division after being defeated by Russia's eventual winner Alexei Tichtchenko.

Belkheir won the gold medal in the same division one year earlier, at the All-Africa Games in Abuja, Nigeria.

References

1977 births
Living people
Featherweight boxers
Boxers at the 2004 Summer Olympics
Olympic boxers of Algeria
Algerian male boxers
African Games gold medalists for Algeria
African Games medalists in boxing
Competitors at the 2003 All-Africa Games
21st-century Algerian people
20th-century Algerian people